2008 Bandung Human Stampede, known as Tragedi AACC (AACC Tragedy) or Sabtu Kelabu (Dark Saturday), was a stampede and mass hysteria that occurred on 9 February 2008 at Asia African Cultural Center or AACC building (now called De Majestic) in Bandung.

Background
Bandung metal band Beside was holding a concert of their first album launch entitled Against Ourselves at AACC building. The concert started at 19:00 (local time). According to many sources, the building where the concert took place was capable to accommodate 500 people.

Incident
The number of attendants of the concert exceeded the capacity of the building where the concert was taking place. There were estimated 800 to 1000 people watching the concert. Apart from the attendants in the building, there were others who were outside of the building. When the concert concluded at 20:30, the panic started as the attendants were leaving the building. As the building was unable to accommodate so many attendants, the air circulation was greatly decreased and the attendants were suffering from asphyxiation, suffocation, dehydration and jostling. The lack of medical staffs caused the impacted attendants to receive no proper medical attention. It was reported that there were a number of people lying on the floor and did not receive medical attention at all.

Aftermath
This mass hysteria claimed 11 lives and left dozen attendants injured. About 3 people were arrested and declared as suspects with charges of negligent homicide. Among the fatalities, there was one female victim.

The AACC building was temporary closed due to the incident. In 2010, it was renovated and renamed to New Majestic. Changes to the management once again saw renaming of the building to De Majestic in 2017. The building now hosts traditional art shows and other events.

Memorial
In 2014, a monument of memorial was erected at Taman Musik Centrum by Arif Prasetya, Head of Bandung City Cemetery and Gardening Service. The names of 11 people killed in the incident were written on the monument.

References 

Concert disasters
Human stampedes in 2008
2008 in Indonesia
Bandung